Aleksandr Çaykovski (born 23 June 1932) is a Turkish sailor. He competed in the Tornado event at the 1984 Summer Olympics.

References

External links
 

1932 births
Living people
Turkish male sailors (sport)
Olympic sailors of Turkey
Sailors at the 1984 Summer Olympics – Tornado
Place of birth missing (living people)